The 2001–02 season was the 83rd season in the existence of AS Saint-Étienne and the club's third consecutive season in the second division of French football. In addition to the domestic league, AS Saint-Étienne competed in this season's edition of the Coupe de France and Coupe de la Ligue. The season covered the period from 1 July 2001 to 30 June 2002.

Players

First-team squad

Transfers

In

Out

Pre-season and friendlies

Competitions

Overall record

French Division 2

League table

Results summary

Results by round

Matches

Coupe de France

Coupe de la Ligue

References 

AS Saint-Étienne seasons
Saint-Étienne